Luke Keeler (born 27 April 1987) is an Irish professional boxer who challenged for the WBO middleweight title in 2020. He participated in the 35th and final edition of the Prizefighter series in 2015, losing in the semi-final.

Professional career
Keeler made his professional debut on 3 May 2013, scoring a first-round stoppage victory against Mihaly Voros at the Carlton Hotel in Dublin, Ireland.

Aftwr his win over Luis Arias, Keeler stated he wanted to fight the best the division had to offer.

In August 2018, Keeler said he got a phone call from Conor McGregor and said McGregor yelled at him and challenged him to a boxing match. “There was just talk over a phone, a shouting match. Far fetched, I know, but his bout with Mayweather would’ve been further fetched so you never know.”

Professional boxing record

References

Living people
1987 births
Irish male boxers
Sportspeople from Dublin (city)
Middleweight boxers